Prime Times is a 1983 American film starring Leslie Nielsen.

External links

1983 films
1983 drama films
American drama films
1980s English-language films
1980s American films